The canton of Terres des Luys et Coteaux du Vic-Bilh is an administrative division of the Pyrénées-Atlantiques department, southwestern France. It was created at the French canton reorganisation which came into effect in March 2015. Its seat is in Serres-Castet.

It consists of the following communes:
 
Anoye
Argelos
Arricau-Bordes
Arrosès
Astis
Aubin
Aubous
Auga
Auriac
Aurions-Idernes
Aydie
Baliracq-Maumusson
Bassillon-Vauzé
Bétracq
Boueilh-Boueilho-Lasque
Bournos
Burosse-Mendousse
Cadillon
Carrère
Castetpugon
Castillon
Caubios-Loos
Claracq
Conchez-de-Béarn
Corbère-Abères
Coslédaà-Lube-Boast
Crouseilles
Diusse
Doumy
Escurès
Garlède-Mondebat
Garlin
Gayon
Gerderest
Lalongue
Lalonquette
Lannecaube
Lasclaveries
Lasserre
Lembeye
Lème
Lespielle
Luc-Armau
Lucarré
Lussagnet-Lusson
Mascaraàs-Haron
Maspie-Lalonquère-Juillacq
Miossens-Lanusse
Monassut-Audiracq
Moncaup
Moncla
Monpezat
Montardon
Mont-Disse
Mouhous
Navailles-Angos
Peyrelongue-Abos
Portet
Pouliacq
Ribarrouy
Saint-Jean-Poudge
Samsons-Lion
Sauvagnon
Séméacq-Blachon
Serres-Castet
Sévignacq
Simacourbe
Tadousse-Ussau
Taron-Sadirac-Viellenave
Thèze
Vialer
Viven

References

Cantons of Pyrénées-Atlantiques